Leon Stuart Davidoff is an American politician, lawyer, businessman, and the deputy mayor of West Hartford. Elected to the West Hartford Town Council in 2007, Davidoff has served as deputy mayor since 2016. He previously served on the Newington Town Council.

Davidoff attended Newington High School, graduating in 1980. He went on to study government and economics at Clark University, and received his J.D. from Case Western Reserve University School of Law in 1987.

A former Republican, Davidoff became a Democrat while on the West Hartford Town Council.

References

1962 births
Living people
People from West Hartford, Connecticut
Connecticut city council members
Connecticut Democrats
People from Newington, Connecticut